Once Bitten, Twice Bitten; The Singles 1981 - 1995 is a greatest hits collection by the New Zealand band The Exponents, released in December 1995. The album reached number one and spent 18 weeks on the New Zealand Album Charts, eventually going five times platinum. The album included two new recordings, "La La Lulu" and "Summer You Never Meant".

Track listing
"Victoria"
"Airway Spies"
"Your Best Friend Loves Me Too"
"All I Can Do"
"Know Your Own Heart"
"I'll Say Goodbye (Even Though I'm Blue)"
"Sex And Agriculture"
"Christchurch (In Cashel St, I Wait)"
"Greater Hopes Greater Expectations"
"Caroline Skies"
"Only I Could Die (and Love You Still)"
"Brand New Doll"
"Why Does Love Do This To Me?"
"Who Loves Who The Most"
"Whatever Happened To Tracey"
"Sink Like A Stone"
"Erotic"
"Like She Said"
"La La Lulu"
"The Summer You Never Meant"

Charts

Weekly charts

Year-end charts

References 

1995 albums
The Exponents albums